Haeck is a surname. Notable people with the surname include:

Christel Haeck (born 1948), Canadian politician
Geertruy Haeck, 15th-century Dutch patrician woman

See also
Heck (surname)